Bleak House is a novel by Charles Dickens.

Bleak House may also refer to:

Adaptations of the book
 Bleak House (1920 film), a silent British film directed by Thomas Bentley
 Bleak House (1959 TV serial)
 Bleak House (1985 TV serial)
 Bleak House (2005 TV serial)

Places
 Bleak House (Knoxville, Tennessee)
 Bleak House, Broadstairs
 Bleak House, Emneth Hungate, Norfolk, the farm belonging to farmer Tony Martin, who shot dead an intruder
 Bleakhouse, a  town in Oldbury, West Midlands

Other
 Bleak House Books, an imprint of Big Earth Publishing
 Bleak House (band), a British heavy metal band

See also